Sanford Bookstaver (born September 1, 1973) is an American film, television director and television producer.

Early life
In 1995, Bookstaver graduated from the USC School of Cinema-Television. In 1999, he directed the film Scriptfellas.

Television
As a television director, some of Bookstaver's episodic credits include Prison Break, The O.C., Chicago Fire, Chicago PD, Dawson's Creek, One Tree Hill, House, Harper's Island, Jericho, White Collar, Fastlane and Bones.

Personal life
Bookstaver married actress Rena Sofer in 2003. On August 5, 2005, the couple's first child together, Avalon Leone, was born in Los Angeles. Bookstaver and Sofer eventually divorced in 2017. In 2019, Sofer announced they had reconciled, and in April she announced their engagement.

References

External links

1973 births
American television directors
Television producers from New York City
Living people
Businesspeople from New York City
USC School of Cinematic Arts alumni
Film directors from New York City